The Eyre Creek is an ephemeral watercourse located in the Mid North region of the Australian state of South Australia.

Course and features
The creek runs along Main North Road. 

The creek was named in honour of Edward John Eyre, who explored the area in 1839 during one of his expeditions.

See also

References

Rivers of South Australia
Mid North (South Australia)